WAPX-FM (91.9 FM) is a radio station licensed to Clarksville, Tennessee, United States.  The station is currently owned by Austin Peay State University.

References

External links

College radio stations in Tennessee
Radio stations in Tennessee